An upper division college or university is one that requires applicants to have already completed  their first two years of undergraduate study at another institution. These institutions traces their roots to educational ideas put forward in the late 19th and early 20th century. They were developed primarily in the United States during the 1960s in response to the growing number of community college students seeking to continue their education.

History
In the late 19th and early 20th century, educational leaders such as William R. Harper and David Starr Jordan sought to separate the preparatory portion of college studies from "real" university work undertaken in the third and fourth years of study.  Jordan, then president of Stanford University, proposed splitting the institution into two parts in 1907 to reach this goal, however changes in the California secondary school system halted this proposal. In 1914 Frank Johnson Goodnow became president of Johns Hopkins University and proposed eliminating the bachelor's degree by cutting the first two years of undergraduate work. Called the Goodnow Plan or New Plan, students would have entered Hopkins after two years of study in other universities and would have worked toward an advanced degree, bypassing the bachelor's degree.

Upper division colleges were first established as mainstream institutions in the 1950s in the United States as a means to respond to the need for educated professionals to assist in the space race.  While earlier efforts had been undertaken at the University of Georgia in 1858, they failed due to the onset of the Civil War.

The first upper division college was the College of the Pacific in Stockton, California, which operated as an upper-division college between 1935 and 1951, before becoming the University of the Pacific in 1961.  This was done as part of a plan to reduce costs and increase enrollment by subletting college facilities to a high school which assumed public junior college status and funding.  However, disagreements between the College of the Pacific and the affiliated junior college, as well as accreditation issues resulting from the arrangement, led to the abandonment of the experiment in 1951.

The first college founded as an upper division college was University of Michigan–Flint, which was founded in 1956 as Flint College, however it converted to four year status in 1965 as a result of changes in the development of the region.

Another notable early upper division college was Florida Atlantic University, which opened in 1964 and served third and fourth year undergraduate students, as well as graduate students.  Later, in 1984, Florida Atlantic expanded to include first and second year undergraduates and ceased to be an upper division college.

At the time they were created, upper division colleges were seen as a way to better manage community resources and provide opportunities for students.  It was thought that separating the upper division from the lower division of coursework would improve the relationship between undergraduate and graduate programs.  Additionally, some believed that by creating 2+2 programs between community colleges and upper division colleges, students could continue their education without the state needing to expand existing community colleges into full four year colleges.  Some commentators at the time saw the widespread development of upper division schools, in the same way community colleges had expanded in the prior decades.

Decline
By the 1980s and 1990s, many states began to move away from the upper-division model.  Despite concerns of crowding out of community colleges, it was felt that offering only the upper-level courses resulted in a poor public image and prevented the establishment of a full university setting.  Many of the students seeking to transfer from a community college desired a full college experience, including electives and extra-curricular activities.  The inability to reach a large critical mass prevented the upper division colleges from competing effectively with four year colleges.  Some upper-division colleges such as the City University of New York's Richmond College merged with community colleges, while others such as Florida Atlantic and SUNY Institute of Technology opened their doors to freshman and sophomore undergraduates.   very few upper-division colleges remain in the United States, with almost all merging with community colleges or converting to four year status.

Colleges

References

Types of university or college
Higher education